The 1918 Stanley Cup playoffs were played from March 11 until March 30, when the National Hockey League (NHL) champion Toronto Blue Shirts defeated the Pacific Coast Hockey Association (PCHA) champion Vancouver Millionaires for the Stanley Cup.

NHL Championship
Montreal had won the first half of the NHL split season and Toronto had won the second half. The two teams then played a two-game total goals series for the NHL championship and the O'Brien Cup.  Toronto won the series and advanced to the Stanley Cup final.

PCHA championship

The Vancouver Millionaires defeated the defending Stanley Cup Seattle Metropolitans, taking a two-game total-goals series 3–2 on a 1–0 win over Seattle in the second game. Barney Stanley scored the decisive goal, the only goal of the second game.

Seattle Metropolitans vs. Vancouver Millionaires

Vancouver Millionaires win two-games total-goals series 3–2.

Stanley Cup Finals

Statistics

NHL playoff scoring leaders
GP = Games Played, G = Goals, A = Assists, Pts = Points

References

See also
 1917-18 NHL season
 1917-18 PCHA season

Stanley Cup playoffs
March 1918 sports events
Stanley